The Patsy is a 1928 American silent comedy-drama film directed by King Vidor, co-produced by and starring Marion Davies for Cosmopolitan Productions, and released by Metro-Goldwyn-Mayer. It was based on a play of the same name by Barry Conners, and served as Marie Dressler's comeback film after a long slump in her film career. Davies played the dowdy and downtrodden Patricia, the younger daughter in a household ruled by an imperious mother (Dressler) and selfish sister (Jane Winton).

Cast
 Marion Davies as Patricia Harrington
 Orville Caldwell as Tony Anderson
 Marie Dressler as Ma Harrington
 Lawrence Gray as Billy Caldwell
 Dell Henderson as Pa Harrington
 Jane Winton as Grace Harrington

Production

The Patsy saw Marion Davies starring in her 27th film. This was Davies' first film of three with director King Vidor and the only time she appeared with Marie Dressler.

Release and legacy 
The film received good reviews, and was a box office hit. Hearst and MGM subsequently assigned Vidor to begin working on another vehicle for Davies. The Patsy also served as a comeback vehicle for Dressler.

In February 2020, the film was shown at the 70th Berlin International Film Festival, as part of a retrospective dedicated to King Vidor's career.

References

External links
 
 
 
 
 
 
 

1928 comedy-drama films
1928 films
American black-and-white films
1920s English-language films
American silent feature films
Films directed by King Vidor
Metro-Goldwyn-Mayer films
1920s American films
Silent American comedy-drama films